The shilling (Swahili: shilingi; abbreviation: TSh; code: TZS) is the currency of Tanzania. It is subdivided into 100 cents (senti in Swahili).
The Tanzanian shilling replaced the East African shilling on 14 June 1966 at par.

Notation

An equals sign or hyphen represents zero amount. For example, 50 cents is written as "" and 100 shillings as "" or "100/-". Sometimes the abbreviation TSh is prefixed for distinction. If the amount is written using words as well as numerals, only the prefix is used (e.g. TSh 10 million).

This pattern was modelled on sterling's pre-decimal notation, in which amounts were written in some combination of pounds (£), shillings (s), and pence (d, for denarius).  In that notation, amounts under a pound were notated only in shillings and pence.

Coins

Cupro-nickel  coins were introduced in 1972, followed by scalloped, nickel-brass  in 1977. This First Series coins set, in circulation from 1966 up to 1984, was designed by Christopher Ironside OBE.

The  coin was issued on 8 September 2014.

Banknotes

A new series of notes came out in 2011. These new notes include many security features that prevent counterfeiting.

Currently in Circulation

See also
 Economy of Tanzania
 Ugandan shilling
 Kenyan shilling

References

Notes

Sources

External links

 Bank of Tanzania page on circulating banknotes
 The banknotes of Tanzania
  

Circulating currencies
Currencies of the Commonwealth of Nations
Currencies of Tanzania
Currencies introduced in 1966